Kailen Mary Iacovoni Sheridan (born July 16, 1995) is a Canadian professional soccer player who plays as a goalkeeper for National Women's Soccer League club San Diego Wave and the Canada national team.

College career
Sheridan played her college soccer for the Clemson Tigers. Sheridan played for the Tigers from 2013 to 2016 under coach Eddie Radwanski. Sheridan made 76 appearances for the Tigers recording 229 saves and 28 shutouts. In both 2014 and 2015, Sheridan was named to the All-ACC first team.  Her nomination to the team in 2014 was the first for a Tiger since 2007.

Club career

Toronto Lady Lynx
In 2013, she played with the Toronto Lady Lynx.

NJ/NY Gotham
In January 2017, Sheridan was selected as the 23rd overall pick by Sky Blue FC at the 2017 NWSL College Draft. She was later named an allocated player by Canada Soccer.

Sheridan was named to the Team of the Month for May 2017, she recorded 19 saves during the month, helping Sky Blue to a 3–1–0 record. Sheridan's 2018 season saw her start and play all but one of Sky Blue's games where she led the league with 7.38 goals prevented per game. She started her 2019 season by winning back-to-back NWSL Saves of the Week in weeks 2 and 3. Sheridan would be a finalist for NWSL goalkeeper of the year twice in 2019 and 2021.

San Diego Wave
After 5 seasons in New Jersey, Sheridan would be traded to NWSL expansion club San Diego Wave in December 2021 in exchange for $130,000 in allocation money, and expansion draft protection.

International career
Sheridan has represented Canada on the senior national team as well as numerous youth national teams including the U-17, U-20 and U-23 teams. She made her debut for the senior national team in March 2016 at the 2016 Algarve Cup. Sheridan was an alternate at the 2016 Summer Olympics in Rio. Sheridan was called up for the 2017 Algarve Cup.

Sheridan was added to the roster for the 2018 CONCACAF Women's Championship after an injury to goalkeeper Erin McLeod.

On May 25, 2019, she was named to the roster for the 2019 FIFA Women's World Cup. On August 6, 2021, she won the Olympic Gold Medal in the 2020 Summer Olympics with Canada.

With the retirement of Stephanie Labbé in 2022, Sheridan became Canada's starting goalkeeper. She won the Golden Glove as the best goalkeeper at the 2022 CONCACAF W Championship, allowing only one goal in five appearances that saw Canada qualify for the 2023 FIFA Women's World Cup. She was also named to the tournament's Best XI.

Career statistics

Club

Honours
Canada
 Summer Olympics: 2021
Individual
 CONCACAF W Championship Best XI: 2022
 CONCACAF W Championship Golden Glove: 2022
 NWSL Goalkeeper of the Year: 2022
 NWSL Best XI: 2021, 2022
 NWSL Challenge Cup Golden Glove: 2020

References

Notes

External links
 

 
 NJ?NY Gotham FC player profile
 Clemson Tigers player profile

1995 births
Living people
Canada women's international soccer players
Canadian women's soccer players
Clemson Tigers women's soccer players
Footballers at the 2015 Pan American Games
National Women's Soccer League players
NJ/NY Gotham FC draft picks
NJ/NY Gotham FC players
Soccer people from Ontario
Sportspeople from Whitby, Ontario
Women's association football goalkeepers
2019 FIFA Women's World Cup players
Pan American Games competitors for Canada
Footballers at the 2020 Summer Olympics
Olympic soccer players of Canada
Olympic medalists in football
Medalists at the 2020 Summer Olympics
Olympic gold medalists for Canada
Pickering FC (women) players
San Diego Wave FC players
Toronto Lady Lynx players